Maine Central School, also known as J. Ralph Ingalls School, is an historic school building located at Maine in Broome County, New York.

It was built in 1940 and is a substantial two-story, nearly square building.  It has a steel frame structural system, clad in red brick over concrete block and limestone trim.

It features a low hipped roof crowned by a multi-stage cupola with a Chippendale-inspired balustrade in the Colonial Revival style.  The main block is organized around a center entrance within a monumental two-story, three-bay projecting wooden portico.

The school was built in part with funds provided by the PWA—Public Works Administration.

It was listed on the National Register of Historic Places in 1998.

References

Buildings and structures in Binghamton, New York
School buildings completed in 1940
Works Progress Administration in New York (state)
History of Broome County, New York
National Register of Historic Places in Broome County, New York
School buildings on the National Register of Historic Places in New York (state)
Colonial Revival architecture in New York (state)